"Hey Matthew" is a song by British musician Karel Fialka, released as a single in 1987. It was later included on his 1988 studio album, Human Animal.

The song has minimal instrumentation with only synthesizers and a drum machine being used. It follows the lyrics of the stepfather (Fialka) questioning his stepson, Matthew, as to what he sees on television (to which a young child's voice responds: Dallas, Dynasty, Terrahawks, He-Man, Tom and Jerry, Dukes of Hazzard, Airwolf, Blue Thunder, Rambo, Road Runner, Daffy Duck and The A-Team); and what he wants to be (as a profession) when he grows up: "a soldier, street fighter, a police man, a captain of a boat (... big boat), magic man, a cowboy, train driver, high jump champion, a fireman, a pilot, I want to be your friend.").

The video follows the plot of the song, with the camera making it appear that the viewer is looking in on the family through the television.

The song was Fialka's biggest chart hit, peaking at number 9 on the UK Singles Chart and spending eight weeks in the listings. It also reached No. 15 in Germany and No. 29 on the U.S. Modern Rock chart.

In 1997, both Karel and Matthew appeared on Never Mind the Buzzcocks in the Identity Parade lineup. Both were identified successfully.

Charts

References

External links
 

1987 songs
1987 singles
Songs about children
Songs about fathers
Songs about television
I.R.S. Records singles
British synth-pop songs